Saudemont is a commune in the Pas-de-Calais department in the Hauts-de-France region of France.

Geography
The A26 autoroute passes by at a distance of half a mile.

Population

Places of interest
 The church of St.Léger, dating from the twelfth century.

See also
Communes of the Pas-de-Calais department

References

External links

 Official website of the mairie of Saudemont

Communes of Pas-de-Calais